Milano2 (also known as Milano Due) is a residential centre in the Italian town of Segrate (Province of Milan). It was built as a new town by Edilnord, a company associated with  Silvio Berlusconi in 1970's.

The main peculiarity of Milano2 is its walkability: A system of walkways, cycle paths and bridges connects the whole neighborhood, so that it is possible to walk around without ever intersecting traffic. It was marketed as a residential neighborhood for families of the upper middle class with children.

The works started in 1971, and were completed in 1979. Distinctive landmarks are the sporting facilities, a small artificial lake (il laghetto) and a children's and adults playgrounds and lots of green areas so you can also think to live inside a park.

Media
Milano2 also hosted the headquarters of the first Italian private television channel, TeleMilanocavo, a small cable network that started broadcasting in the area in 1974. Few years laters it changed its name into Telemilano and when Silvio Berlusconi bought it changed the name again into Canale 5, the first national private TV station.

External links
—

Frazioni of the Province of Milan
New towns
New towns started in the 1970s
Populated places established in 1970
1970 establishments in Italy
Fininvest
Mass media in Milan
Segrate